is a Japanese artistic gymnast. Born in Osaka, he graduated from Nippon Sport Science University and later joins Tokushukai Gymnastics Club. Taura has represented Japan at several FIG World Cup competitions.

See also 
 Japan men's national gymnastics team

References

External links 
 Seiya Taura at FIG website

Japanese male artistic gymnasts
Sportspeople from Osaka Prefecture
Living people
1995 births
21st-century Japanese people